James "Jimmy" Rogers Webb (born April 13, 1952 in Jackson, Mississippi) is a former American football defensive lineman who played seven seasons in the National Football League.

Football career 
Webb grew up playing football in central Mississippi, and played in college for the Mississippi State Bulldogs football team from 1972-1974. By his senior season, he was named an All-American on the defensive line.

Webb was selected as the 10th pick of the 1975 NFL Draft. After being drafted, he held out for 43 days before signing with the San Francisco 49ers. He would go on to play over 100 games in the NFL.

During his second NFL season, Webb was admitted into the first class of the Mississippi State University College of Veterinary Medicine. Webb would attend the college during his offseasons, and graduated with his DVM degree in 1982.

Personal life 
After retiring from football following the 1981 NFL season, Webb has practiced veterinary medicine in California's Central Valley, specializing in embryo transfer. Webb has also developed his own herd of wagyu cattle, marketing live animals, semen, and embryos.

Webb has been married to his wife Cindy for over 40 years. Their twin sons, Josh and Micah, both attended UCLA and played on the Bruins football team.

References

1952 births
Living people
Players of American football from Jackson, Mississippi
All-American college football players
American football defensive tackles
American football defensive ends
Mississippi State Bulldogs football players
San Francisco 49ers players
San Diego Chargers players